Njinga: Queen Of Angola is a 2013 Angolan historical epic film directed by Sérgio Graciano. The film stars Lesliana Pereira as Queen Njinga Mbandi, fighting to liberate Angola.

Plot
The film is set in 17th-century Angola and presents the true story of Queen Njinga Mbandi. While her father is king, she trains in military strategy. Her father, brother and nephew each take turns leading their people, but all meet a mysterious death. Njinga then becomes queen, leading wars against the Portuguese and resisting the Dutch invasion.

Cast
 Lesliana Pereira as Queen Njinga Mbandi
 Erica Chissapa as Kifunji
 Ana Santos 
 Sílvio Nascimento as Jaga Kasa Cangola
 Miguel Hurst as Njali
 Jaime Joaquim as Mbandi
 Orlando Sérgio as Jaga Casacassage

Production
It took six years for the producers to raise money to make the film. Screenwriter Isilda Hurst spent two and a half years researching the Queen and the historical context of her story. The studio consulted historians while researching for the film. Filming took place in Kissama National Park in Angola over nine weeks. The filmmakers chose to use Portuguese as the primary language of the film because they felt it would allow the greatest number of Angolans to understand the film, even though that is historically inaccurate.

Release
The film was screened at the 2014 Montreal World Film Festival. It then premiered in the UK at the Film Africa film festival in London on 6 November 2014, and advance tickets sold out so quickly that the film had to be moved to a larger venue. It screened again during the African Diaspora International Film Festival in Washington, DC.

Reception
In African Studies Review, Fernando Arenas wrote that despite the characters lacking emotional depth, the film "stands out in the context of African cinema for its ambition in portraying one of the monumental chapters of the continent's history". The film won two awards at the 2015 Africa Movie Academy Awards: Best Actress in a leading role for Lesliana Pereira and Achievement in Makeup.

Television adaptation
The film was adapted into a television show of the same name, which aired from 2014 to 2015.

References

External links 
 Official website (archived)
 
 Historian Dr Ama Biney discusses Njinga, Queen of Angola at BFI

Films set in Angola
Angolan drama films
2010s Portuguese-language films
Best Makeup Africa Movie Academy Award winners